Tara A Wheeler (born 8 June 1999) is an Australian cricketer who plays as a right-handed batter. She last played for Queensland in the Women's National Cricket League (WNCL).

Domestic career
Wheeler plays grade cricket for Gold Coast District Cricket Club. She made her debut for Queensland against South Australia in the WNCL on 6 March 2022, although she did not bat as the match was rained off. She went on to play five matches overall in the tournament, with a top score of 18.

References

External links

Tara Wheeler at Cricket Australia

1999 births
Living people
Place of birth missing (living people)
Australian women cricketers
Queensland Fire cricketers